Cookin' on 3 Burners are an Australian funk trio from Melbourne, consisting of Jake Mason, Dan West and Ivan Khatchoyan. Their 2009 song "This Girl" was remixed by French DJ and record producer Kungs and released in February 2016, peaking at number one in France, Germany, Belgium, Hungary, Latvia, Scotland and number 2 on the UK Singles Chart.

History

Formation and early releases
Originally made up of Hammond organ player Jake Mason, guitarist Lance Ferguson, and drummer Ivan Khatchoyan, the trio formed in 1997. In 2000 they released Steamed Up on the Newmarket Music label. The instrumental album features Melbourne-based guitarist Matt Kirsch. In 2002 the ensemble released their first 7" single, "Gravel Rash/Pie Warmer" on the Bamboo Shack label and in 2005 they signed to Knowfoowl Records (for Australia and New Zealand) and UK-based label Freestyle Records (ROW).

Baked, Broiled and Fried (2007)
Their first album on Freestyle and Knowfoowl Records, Baked, Broiled & Fried, was released in 2007. The 13-track album included 11 instrumentals and two vocal tracks featuring Kylie Auldist and Fallon Williams. The album featured a reworking of The Gorillaz' track "Feel Good Inc.", which also became popular with the B-boy community. The trio toured and performed alongside acts such as Alice Russell, Quantic, Fat Freddy's Drop, and Sharon Jones & The Dap-Kings.

Soul Messin'  (2009)
In 2009, Cookin' on 3 Burners released their second album, Soul Messin. The record received praise for its cover of Gary Numan's song, "Cars" while the album's lead single, "This Girl", featuring Kylie Auldist on vocals, reached the number one spot on the UK iTunes R&B chart.

In 2013, Ferguson left the group to focus on his own project, The Bamboos, and was replaced by Dan West.

Blind Bet (2014)
In 2014 the group released its third record on Freestyle, Blind Bet, which featured artists including Daniel Merriweather, Harry Angus, Kylie Auldist, Jason Heerah, and the Cruel Sea frontman Tex Perkins.

"The Writing's on the Wall" (2015)
In 2015 Cookin' on 3 Burners again collaborated with Tex Perkins on the single "The Writing's on the Wall".

The group also began working with the Australian hip hop artist Mantra. The collaboration took the band in a new direction, introducing more hip hop-based tempos and funk/electro vibes to their mixes.

Remix of "This Girl" by Kungs (2016)
In 2016 Cookin' on 3 Burners collaborated with French electronic producer Kungs on a reworking of "This Girl". The song was originally included on the trio's 2009 album Soul Messin and released as a limited edition 7". The Kungs vs Cookin' on 3 Burners version of "This Girl" was released on 28 February on the House of Barclay label. The song reached number 1 in France, Germany and charted highly across Europe.

Members
 Jake Mason – Hammond organ (1997–present) 
 Ivan Khatchoyan – drums (1997–present)
 Lance Ferguson – guitar (1997–1999, 2001–2013) 
 Matt Kirsch – guitar (2000–2001)
 Dan West – guitar (2013–present)

Awards and nominations

APRA Music Awards

|-
| 2017
| "This Girl" 
| Dance Work of the Year 
| 
|-
| 2018
| "Mind Made Up" 
| Dance Work of the Year 
| 
|-

ARIA Music Awards

|-
| 2016
| "This Girl"
| ARIA Award for Song of the Year
| 
|-

Music Victoria Awards
The Music Victoria Awards, are an annual awards night celebrating Victorian music. They commenced in 2005.

|-
| 2014
| Blind Bet
| Best Soul/Funk/R&B and Gospel Album
| 
|-
| 2017
| Lab Experiments Vol 1
| Best Soul/Funk/R&B and Gospel Album
| 
|-

Discography

Studio albums

Live albums

Compilation albums

Extended plays

Singles

References

External links
Official website
 Cookin' on 3 Burners on Facebook

Musical groups established in 1997
Australian funk musical groups
Australian musical trios
1997 establishments in Australia
Musical groups from Melbourne